Novoburassky District is an administrative and municipal district (raion), one of the thirty-eight in Saratov Oblast, Russia. It is located in the north of the oblast. Its administrative center is the urban locality (a work settlement) of Novye Burasy. Population: 16,359 (2010 Census);  The population of Novye Burasy accounts for 35.9% of the district's total population.

References

Notes

Sources

Districts of Saratov Oblast